William H. Conn (1895–1973) was an Irish cartoonist, illustrator, watercolourist and poster artist. The son of a lithographer, he was educated at the Ulster Provincial School, now Friends' School, Lisburn. From 1936 he was a staff artist for the Belfast Telegraph and its sports sister paper Ireland's Saturday Night, creating a regular strip, "The Doings of Larry O'Hooligan", for the latter. He drew a monthly full-page illustration (two pages in the Christmas edition) for Dublin Opinion magazine, sometimes satirical, sometimes observational scenes of rural and urban Irish life, sometimes ghostly gothic scenes, and also contributed spot cartoons. He created colour posters for Northern Ireland Railways and exhibited his watercolours and black and white drawings. He died on 25 August 1973 after a three-year illness. He was a lifelong bachelor.

References
Thomas J. Collins & Charles E. Kelly (eds.), Fifteen Years of Dublin Opinion, Dublin Opinion Ltd, 1937
Theo Snoddy, Dictionary of Irish Artists: 20th Century, Merlin Publishing, 2002

External links
Works by William H. Conn at Ross's Fine Art Auctioneers

1895 births
1973 deaths
Artists from Northern Ireland
Editorial cartoonists from Northern Ireland
Illustrators from Northern Ireland
Artists from Belfast